Sea Dance Festival is a summer music festival held at Buljarica Beach in Montenegro. It has been held at Jaz Beach in Budva since July 2014 until 2017, as a part of the EXIT Adventure, an extension of EXIT Festival.

Just after its first edition, Sea Dance Festival was officially proclaimed as the 'Best Medium Sized European festival' at the European Festivals Awards, held in Groningen in January 2015. Following the recognition at the European Festival Awards, Sea Dance Festival teamed up with London-based media company AEI and its global brands UKF and TheSoundYouNeed for the second edition of the festival.

In short time, Sea Dance gained international media attention, featuring an article in Forbes magazine that listed Sea Dance Festival, together with EXIT Festival in Top 10 Europe's Summer Festivals. At the national level, Sea Dance festival won Montenegro Wild beauty Award for the event with greatest promotional effect for Montenegro.

Location 

Buljarica Beach is 2,250 m (7,382 ft) long and is a 30-minute ride along the azure coast from the Old Town in Budva as well as about 1 km (0.62 mi) from Petrovac in the direction of Bar. It is a pebble beach combined with soft sand.

Key stages 

The key stages of the festival include the Main stage with its 30,000 attendee capacity, No Sleep Stage, Reggae Stage, Silent Dance, Latino Stage, Cinema, and CHILL Zone. Dance Paradise Stage was replaced with the No Sleep Stage in 2017.

History by years

Sea Dance 2014 
The first Sea Dance Festival was held from 15 to 17 July 2014 at the Jaz Beach in Budva, and represented 3 days of music performances. The festival was part of the EXIT Adventure, representing an additional 3 days of EXIT Festival. First edition of the festival visited 80 thousand people, making it one of the most visited events in Montenegro.

Be Human Charity Events

The EXIT Foundation's EXIT AID program, designed to help those affected by the devastating floods in Serbia, Bosnia, and Croatia organised the VIP humanitarian part of Sea Dance Festival entitled "BE HUMAN!"

The event was a collaborative effort between the EXIT Foundation and the municipality of Budva, and Dukley Gardens, with the support from the Government of the Republic of Serbia and Government of Montenegro as well as the National Tourist Organisation of Montenegro and Tourist Organisation of Budva.

Be Human featured music stars Jamiroquai and Example and took place at Dukley Gardens during Sea Dance Festival. Entrance was only available to GOLD and PLATINUM VIP ticket holders.

All profits made from GOLD and PLATINUM VIP ticket sales for Sea Dance Festival went to floodrelief efforts in Serbia, Bosnia, and Croatia. The total sum of aid collected by the Municipality of Budva and EXIT AID, counting BE HUMAN events, is over 140 000EUR in funds and 80 000EUR worth of goods. The collected aid was distributed to flood relief efforts as coordinated by the Government of the Republic of Serbia.

Sea Dance 2015 

Second edition of Sea Dance festival was held from 15 to 18 July 2015 on Jaz Beach, with headlining acts such as The Prodigy, as well as Rudimental and Roisin Murphy.

The appearance of this year's festival was modified in comparison to previous year, and had six outdoor stages, that offered various music genres. Sea Dance Festival also increased the number of foreign visitors for 70% in comparison to the previous year, with people from more than 40 countries of the world passing through the festival gates. It also set a record in overall attendance  around 110,000 people were present at Jaz Beach.

The festival site also included a camping place, located 50 meters away from the Jaz Beach, which sits next to the Main stage.

In 2015 Main Stage hosted stars and artists from various music genres, including: The Prodigy, Rudimental, Sigma, Wilkinson, Róisín Murphy, Noisia, Brookes Brothers, Black Sun Empire, Fred V & Grafix, Calyx, TeeBee, Maduk, Dubioza Kolektiv.

Dance Paradise Stage hosted: Bondax, Flight Facilities, Gramatik, Odesza, Star Slinger, TCTS, Soul Clap, PillowTalk, James Zabiela, Kim Ann Foxman and.

Sea Dance 2016 
Sea Dance 2016 was held 14–16 July 2016. In 2015 Main Stage hosted stars and artists such as: Skrillex, Hurts, Lost Frequencies, Stereo MCs, Andy C, Banco de Gaia, Sub Focus, Goldie, Zomboy, Cartoon, Filatov & Karas, S.A.R.S., Who See and many more.

Dance Paradise Stage hosted: Jeff Mills, Sister Bliss, Black Coffee and many more.

Due to rain, overall attendance was 75,000 people in three days.

Sea Dance 2017 

Sea Dance Festival took place 13–15 July 2017. The headlining acts for Sea Dance 2017 included Sean Paul, John Newman, Fatboy Slim, Mahmut Orhan and many more. Sea Dance 2017 featured No Sleep Stage instead of Dance Paradise Stage.

The overall attendance was 65,000 people in three days.

Sea Dance 2018 

Sea Dance Festival took place 30 August–1 September. It was the first time the location of the festival has been changed, moving from Jaz Beach to Buljarica Beach in Budva.

The headlining acts for Sea Dance 2018 included Chic, Dimitri Vegas & Like Mike, Paul Kalkbrenner, Alice Merton, as well as Bajaga i Instruktori, Bassivity Showcase, Burak Yeter, Filatov & Karas, Hladno Pivo, Lost Frequencies, Rambo Amadeus, Van Gogh and many more.

The overall attendance was 47,000 people in three days.

Sea Dance 2019 
Sea Dance Festival took place 30 August–1 September.

The headlining acts for Sea Dance 2019 included David Guetta, Sven Väth, Richie Hawtin, Robin Schulz and many more.

The overall attendance was 63,000 people in three days.

Sea Dance 2020 
Sea Dance Festival was supposed to take place 28–30 August, until it's postponement to August 2021 due to the 2019/20 COVID–19 Pandemic.

The headlining acts for Sea Dance 2020 were supposed to include Martin Garrix and many more.

Sea Dance 2021 
Sea Dance Festival took place 26–29 August, with the 28 August program moved to the next day, due to the weather circumstances.

The headlining acts for Sea Dance 2021 included Boris Brejcha, Maceo Plex, Meduza, Tale Of Us, Topic and many more.

The overall attendance was 22,000 people in three days.

Sea Dance 2022 
Sea Dance Festival took place 26–28 August.

The headlining acts for Sea Dance 2022 included Dubioza Kolektiv, Konstrakta, Mahmut Orhan, Senidah, Shouse and many more.

The overall attendance was 40,000 people in three days.

Sea Dance 2023 
Sea Dance Festival will take place 18–20 August.

Festival by year

See also

List of electronic music festivals
Live electronic music

References

External links

Music festivals established in 2014
Budva
Electronic music festivals in Montenegro
Summer events in Montenegro